The 2016 Victorian Football League season is the 135th season of the Victorian Football Association/Victorian Football League Australian rules football competition.

There were 15 teams competing in the league. The season started on Saturday 9 April and concluded Sunday 25 September with the VFL Grand Final, won by the Footscray reserves, who defeated the Casey Scorpions by 31 points at Etihad Stadium. It was the Footscray reserves' second VFL premiership, won in just its third season in the competition.

League membership and affiliations
At the end of the 2015 season,  ended its ten-year partial reserves affiliation with North Ballarat. The move was in part motivated by a burgeoning partnership between the City of Ballarat and North Melbourne's AFL rivals , with North Melbourne not wishing to continue its investment in the Ballarat area if the rewards were to be reaped by another club. North Melbourne's existing partial affiliation with Werribee was upgraded to a full affiliation, and North Ballarat continued to contest the VFL as a stand-alone senior club.

Beginning in the 2016 season, a new statewide women's football league known as VFL Women's was established by AFL Victoria. The competition was formed from clubs previously established in the Victorian Women's Football League, and was aligned and co-branded with the VFL to improve market penetration.

Premiership season

Round 1

Round 2

Round 3

Round 4

Round 5

Round 6

Round 7

Round 8

Round 9

Round 10

Round 11

Round 12

Round 13

Round 14

Round 15

Round 16

Round 17

Round 18

Round 19

Round 20

Round 21

Ladder

Finals series

Qualifying and Elimination Finals

Semi-finals

Preliminary Finals

Grand Final

Awards
 The Frosty Miller Medal was won by Ahmed Saad (Coburg), who kicked 49 goals during the home-and-away season.
The J. J. Liston Trophy was won by Michael Gibbons (Williamstown), who polled 17 votes. George Horlin-Smith (Geelong reserves) finished second with 15 votes, and Ben Jolley (Williamstown) and Toby Pinwill (Port Melbourne) were equal third with 14 votes.
The Fothergill-Round Medal was won by Luke Ryan (Coburg).
The Development League premiership was won by Box Hill. Box Hill 26.16 (172) defeated Casey 10.7 (67) in the Grand Final, played at North Port Oval on 18 September as a curtain-raiser to the seniors first preliminary final.

Notable events
In August, the Frankston Football Club, struggling with debts in excess of $1,000,000 and a downturn in the profitability of its poker machine licence, went into voluntary administration. The club's VFL licence was terminated the following month, in the week after the VFL Grand Final, resulting in the club missing the 2017 season before being readmitted in 2018 after resolving its financial issues.

See also 
 List of VFA/VFL premiers
 Australian rules football
 Victorian Football League
 Australian Football League
 2016 AFL season

References

Victorian Football League seasons
VFL